Voice of Tranquility is a Filipino rock and metal band formed in 2003 from Taguig City, Philippines and was founded by Valentine, along with Rny Jane Demano.

The band played alongside international artists, Anthrax, Hellyeah, Death Angel, Nervecell (UAE), Kreator, Hatebreed, Bullet For My Valentine, Asking Alexandria, Crossfaith (Japan), The Black Dahlia Murder, Goddamn (Norway), Metal Heads with Broken Hearts (Norway), Asian Core (Japan), Desecrator (Australia), Argies (Argentina), Arah Kiri (Malaysia), Harmong Drive (Norway), Deathtopia (Japan).

History

Early years (2003–2005)
Voice of Tranquility hails from Taguig. The band was originally named Skit back in December 2003, but in the beginning of year 2005 they have decided to rename the band into Paperdoll, halfway of the same year they changed the band name again into Charlotte. The band is composed by a group of high school friends from Saint Francis of Assisi College System-Taguig Campus and St. Ives School in Bagumbayan, Taguig, and was founded by their own drummer, Valentine along with their former vocalist Arnie Jane Demano, former guitarist Philmart Pilande, and former bassist Dexter Miranda who left due to a conflict with their schedules.

From Skit to Voice Of Tranquility, Demo CD (2006–2008)
Back in December 2006, Valentine decided to change the band label into its present name Voice of Tranquility. Since then, they started playing live shows in the underground scene. They got their first appearance gig around 2006 at Harmony Bar in Ortigas, Pasig. At that time, the band's line-up was-Rny Jane Demano on vocals, Sammad Abubakkar on bass, and on guitars are Raul Babor and the brothers Luther John and Kim Oplida.
In the year 2007, they used an mp3 player to record their first raw track demo entitled Anal Sacrifice, which is a cover from their brother band - Almoranaz. In that same year the band got some several line-up changes.

The Army of Hades (2009–2010)

In February 2009, the guitarist Carl Justine Morales reunited with the band years after he rejects the offer to be part of the first line-up. On the other hand, they also asked Miguel Fontiveros from a local metal group, to fill the bass section. The band released their first EP entitled "The Army of Hades", recorded at Earbender Studios in Kawit, Cavite. It was mixed and engineered by Macoy Manuel of SIN. The songs in the EP have been aired at RJ Underground Radio (105.9 FM) - a Local FM Radio Station in Metro Manila, Philippines, and in Online Radio Stations and Podcast Shows across the world like Metal Messiah Radio, Cebu Metal Online Radio of Cebu City, The World Metal Podcast of Guatemala and a lot more. The band had several radio interviews and guested in different stations and shows like RJ Underground Radio 105.9 FM, The Bel and Joey Show on Digradio (Former NU 107) and more. Since then, they played numerous shows, in and out of the metro like: Gods of Metal, Red Horse Beer-Rakista Rakrakan Series and Rakista Jam Tayo, Filipino Metal Magazine Launch Tour, Tower of Doom Event, Lamb of God – Wrath Album Listening Tour (Warner Music Philippines), Indiemand Events, to list a few.

Pulp Summer Slam 11 and Stig Awards (2011–2012)

In February 2011, they added Janjan Molina of the band Goredemise as their new guitarist, to fill in the rhythm section.

In that year also, the band was given a chance to be a part of the "25 Local Loudest Bands" that would play for the annual Pulp Summer Slam XI – Resurrection at Amoranto Stadium, in Quezon City (The Mecca of Rock in the Philippines), last April 30, 2011, featuring Anthrax, Death Angel, Hellyeah, and U.A.E's Finest Death Metal Band: Nervecell. The band was featured on Pulp Magazine's September 2011 Issue, and they also played at Skarlet Jazz Kitchen, Timog Avenue, Quezon City for Pulp Magazine / Pulp Live World's Arch Enemy - Khaos Legions Album Launch.

In 2012, they performed at Pulp Magazine / Pulp Live World's Megadeth's Pre-Concert Show in South Bar, Las Pinas. Around the month of November in the same year, their founder / drummer, Valentine, was nominated on 'Stig Awards (formerly known as Stagg Awards), which is organized by the biggest music retailer in the Philippines (The Music Source and Lyric).

The Army of Hades II - Re-issue (2013)
Voice Of Tranquility's second release is entitled The Army of Hades II which is a re-issue of their 2009 EP for International Distribution under Bhumidhuka Production – Malaysia, was released on January 12, 2013, in Philippines, January 16, 2013, in Malaysia (Worldwide Release), January 21, 2013 in Thailand and February 17, 2013, in Indonesia, as well in Germany and other parts of the globe for the celebration of their ninth anniversary.
In that year also, the band was nominated for "Best Music-YouTube Category" at Globe Tatt Awards 2013.

10 Years of Existence and Pulp Summer Slam 14 (Early 2014)
Voice of Tranquility celebrated their tenth anniversary gig in January 2014 and were chosen as one of the seven local acts that performed back on April 26, 2014, in PULP Summer Slam XIV: Children of the Damned, the biggest annual music festival in the country, at the Amoranto Stadium, Quezon City, Philippines. The mentioned festival was headlined by Asking Alexandria and Bullet For My Valentine with Kreator, Death Angel, The Black Dahlia Murder, Hatebreed and Crossfaith from Japan.

Downfall (2015 - Early 2017)
In July 2015, Voice of Tranquility's founder and longtime drummer Valentine Parco Caroche, left the band because of private reasons. In spite of that, he still pursued his passion for music and continued playing drums for other bands like Tevanny, Sanctus, and Mr. Bones and the Boneyard Circus, to list a few.
On the other hand, the band continued to play live shows along with several session drummers.

The Legacy and Beyond (2017 - 2019)
In summer of 2017, after the hiatus for almost 2 years, their long time drummer, Valentine Parco Caroche finally reconvened with the band, they also played for the first time at Dutdutan Tattoo Convention in September 2017.

During the summer season of 2018, the band signed on their first major record deal with the Philippine-based recording company, Ivory Music and Video (Sony Music Philippines) / Enterphil Entertainment Corporation.

Members
Babie Borja - Vocals (2018–2019/2022–Present)
Kei Deguchi - Bass (2019–Present)
Valentine - Drums (2003-2015/2017–Present)
Derick De Luna - Synths (2019–Present)
Jerico Rangas - Guitars (2019–Present)

Former Members
Deda Willet Dela Cruz - Vocals (2019–2022)
Sammad Abubakkar - Bass (2005–2008) / Guitars (2019–2022)
Arnie Jane "Rny" Ortega - Vocals (2003–2018)
Phimart Pilande - Guitars (2003)
Dexter Miranda - Bass (2003)
Gabriel Mendoza - Bass (2005)
Luther John Oplida - Guitars (2005–2008)
Sammad Abubakkar - Bass (2005–2008)
Jhunlee Kim Oplida - Guitars (2006–2007)
Raul Babor - Guitars (2008)
Rex Aiur - Guitars (2009)
Carl Justine Morales - Guitars (2009–2019)
Janjan Molina - Guitars (2011–2019)
Meg Fontiveros - Bass (2009–2019)

Discography

Singles, Compilations and Videography

Singles
Enemy (2006)
Army of Hades (2008)
Warlord (2009)
This is Our Revenge (2010)
Shadowplay of the Sinistress (2018)
Serpents Rise (2018)
Wild Wild Wild (2020)

Songs
Enemy
Army of Hades
Warlord
Lazarus
...of how you lived and died
Coma
This is our Revenge
Beheading
Serpents Rise
Shadowplay of the Sinistress
Wild Wild Wild

Compilations
Beasts of Modern Aggression 4 Way Split (2010)
Death March Compilation (2010)
East Jakarta Media - Total Bising Compilation - Jakarta, Indonesia (2013)

References

http://eastjakarta-media.blogspot.com/2013/01/interview-with-voice-of-tranquility.html

External links
Facebook
Rakista

2003 establishments in the Philippines
Filipino heavy metal musical groups
Death metal musical groups
Thrash metal musical groups
Musical groups established in 2003
Musical groups from Metro Manila